Thami Lamdaghri or Mdaghri (died 1856) is a well known Moroccan writer and composer of malhun songs. He is known for songs like Al-Gnawi and  Aliq Al-Masrūh.

References
Farid Ababou, "Thami Mdaghri", in Horizons Maghrébins, n° 43 (2000), pp 50–55

Year of birth missing
1856 deaths
Moroccan songwriters
19th-century Moroccan poets
19th-century Moroccan people
19th-century Moroccan writers